Gymnobela bululi is a species of sea snail, a marine gastropod mollusc in the family Raphitomidae.

Description
The length of the shell varies between 39 mm and 47 mm.

Distribution
This marine species occurs off Balut Island, S Mindanao, the Philippines.

References

 Stahlschmidt P., Poppe G.T. & Tagaro S.P. (2018). Descriptions of remarkable new turrid species from the Philippines. Visaya. 5(1): 5-64. page(s): 12, pl. 7 figs 1-2.

External links
 Gastropods.com: Gymnobela bululi

bululi
Gastropods described in 2018